Simm is a surname, most commonly in England and Estonia.

People:
 Benjamin Simm (born 1986), German rugby union player
 Herman Simm (born 1947), former chief the Estonian Defence Ministry's security department, in 2009 convicted of treason
 John Simm (born 1970), British actor and musician
 Juhan Simm (1885-1959), Estonian composer
 Kevin Simm (born 1980), British singer, songwriter, and musician who was a member of the pop group Liberty X
 Paul Simm, a British songwriter, musician and music producer
 Peeter Simm (born 1953), Estonian film director

See also
Sim (disambiguation)

References

English-language surnames
Estonian-language surnames
Surnames from given names